The Men's 5000 metres competition at the 1968 Summer Olympics in Mexico City, Mexico. The event was held at the University Olympic Stadium on  October 15–17.

Competition format

The Men's 5000m competition consisted of three heats (Round 1) and a Final. The top five runners from each heat advanced to the final.

Records
Prior to this competition, the existing world and Olympic records were as follows:

Results

Round 1

Heat 1

Heat 2

Heat 3

Final

Notes: 
Q- Qualified by place
DNF - Did Not Finish

References

External links
 Official Olympic Report, la84foundation.org. Retrieved August 13, 2012.

Athletics at the 1968 Summer Olympics
5000 metres at the Olympics
Men's events at the 1968 Summer Olympics